The Zagreb Quartet (Zagrebački Kvartet), also known as the Zagreb String Quartet (Zagrebački Gudački Kvartet) is a Zagreb–based string quartet formed in 1919. The oldest Croatian chamber ensemble, they have played at more than 3,000 concerts on all continents, recorded more than 60 albums and won numerous domestic and foreign awards, including the Vladimir Nazor Award for lifetime achievement in 2009.

From the beginning, the quartet's repertoire has included traditional and modern compositions by both international and Croatian composers. The Zagreb Quartet has appeared in many of the world's major concert halls including those of Berlin, Bonn, London, Milan, Amsterdam, Budapest, Warsaw, Ankara, Istanbul, New York and Sydney.

Current members

 Marin Maras, violin (member since 2014)
 Davor Philips, violin (member since 2001)
 Hrvoje Philips, viola (member since 2005)
 Martin Jordan, cello (member since 1992)

Previous Members
In more than 95 years of performing, over 30 musicians have made a contribution as part of the quartet. These include:

Original Members
 Vaclav Huml, violin
 Milan Graf, violin
 Ladislav Miranov, viola
 Umberto Fabri, violoncello

Other Members
 Dragutin Arany
 Goran Bakrač
 Zlatko Balija
 Marija Cobenzl
 Fred Kiefer
 Josip Klima
 Zvonimir Pomykalo
 Tomislav Šestak
 Josip Stojanović
 Dušan Stranić
 Stjepan Šulek
 Zlatko Topolski
 Đorđe Trkulja
 Ante Živković
 Goran Končar

Awards and recognition

 2009 Vladimir Nazor Award for lifetime achievement

References

External links
 Zagreb Quartet Official website

Croatian musical groups
String quartets
Culture in Zagreb
Musical groups established in 1919
Vladimir Nazor Award winners